The 1974–75 season was Manchester City's 73rd season of competitive football and 55th season in the top division of English football. In addition to the First Division, the club competed in the FA Cup, Football League Cup and the Texaco Cup.

First Division

League table

Results summary

References

External links

Manchester City F.C. seasons
Manchester City